The $100,000 Fort Harrod Stakes was an American Thoroughbred horse race run annually in mid April at Keeneland Race Course in Lexington, Kentucky. A Listed Race open to horses age four and older, the 1⅝-mile (13 furlongs) event was contested on Polytrack synthetic dirt and was the longest stakes race run at Keeneland. It offered a purse of $100,000 and was one of the races leading up to the Breeders' Cup Marathon.

In 2010, Keeneland did not renew the Fort Harrod Stakes.

Winners

Other North American Marathon races
On dirt
 Brooklyn Handicap
 Gallant Man Handicap
 Tokyo City Cup
 Valedictory Stakes

On turf
 Canadian International Stakes
 San Juan Capistrano Invitational Handicap

References

 January 11, 2008 Breeders Cup.com article titled Keeneland adds Dirt Marathon prep
 Information on the Fort Harrod Stakes at Keeneland

Discontinued horse races
Open long distance horse races
Keeneland horse races
Recurring sporting events established in 2008
Recurring sporting events disestablished in 2010
2008 establishments in Kentucky
2010 disestablishments in Kentucky